Edward Andre Johnson (born December 18, 1983) is a former American football defensive tackle. He was signed by the Indianapolis Colts as undrafted free agent in 2007. He played college football at Penn State.

Early years
Johnson was a multi-sport star at Crockett Technical High School in Detroit, playing football, basketball and track and field.  Won the class B state championship in the 100m and 200m dash in both 1997 and 1998.

Professional career

Indianapolis Colts
Johnson had an immediate impact in his NFL debut, registering 3 solo tackles in the Colt's Week 1 victory over the New Orleans Saints in relief of the injured Anthony McFarland. He would lead Colts linemen in tackles in 2007 with 72, including a season-high 9 tackles in the Colts' AFC Divisional Playoff loss to the San Diego Chargers. He finished the season ranked in the top 20 in tackles among NFL rookies.

The only defensive lineman to start all 16 games for the Colts in 2007, Johnson received the Thomas W. Moses Sr./Noble Max Award, given annually by Indianapolis media to a player "who has overcome adversity in his career, or whose on-field accomplishments exceeded normal expectations."

On September 10, 2008, it was reported that Johnson had been stopped by Hamilton County, Indiana police on I-465 for speeding and was also found to have marijuana in his possession. He was arrested and released after posting bond.  After a brief internal investigation, the Colts cut Johnson from the team less than 24 hours later.

On May 5, 2009, Johnson was re-signed by the Colts, with new head coach Jim Caldwell saying that they would give him a second chance, hoping that he learned from his mistakes.

On October 13, 2009, Johnson was waived by the Colts for the second time. At the press conference announcing the move, Caldwell said that the decision was based more on "production than anything else."

Carolina Panthers 
On February 16, 2010, Johnson signed with the Carolina Panthers.

References

External links
 Indianapolis Colts bio
 "Ed Johnson making his mark," Bryan Strickland, panthers.com, October 22, 2010

1983 births
Living people
Players of American football from Detroit
American football defensive tackles
Penn State Nittany Lions football players
Indianapolis Colts players
Carolina Panthers players